Gerdakaneh Sanjabi (also Romanized as Gerdakāneh Sanjābī; also known as Gerdakāneh) is a village in Nurali Rural District, in the Central District of Delfan County, Lorestan Province, Iran. At the 2006 census, its population was 118, in 27 families.

References 

Towns and villages in Delfan County